This article is about the list of Académica do Porto Novo players.   Académica do Porto Novo is a Cape Verdean football (soccer) club based in Porto Novo, Cape Verde and plays at Estádio Municipal do Porto Novo.  The club was formed on 14 February 1981.

List of players

Notes

References

Académica do Porto Novo
Academico Porto Novo
Association football player non-biographical articles